Raymond F. Jackson (born August 1, 1978) is a former American football running back. He played college football at Michigan and Cincinnati.

Pro football career
After not being selected in the 2002 NFL Draft, Jackson was a summer camp counselor for the Cincinnati city recreation department and later worked at a Wal-Mart.

On March 13, 2003, Jackson signed a two-year contract with the Cincinnati Bengals and participated in training camp with the Bengals. Jackson signed as a free agent with the Tennessee Titans on November 18, 2003. In what would be his only career NFL game, Jackson had three kick returns for 77 yards in the Titans' 2003 regular season finale, a 33–13 win over Tampa Bay.

In 2004, Jackson played six games for the Berlin Thunder of NFL Europe, during which he had 63 carries for 236 yards and a touchdown.

References

1978 births
Living people
American football running backs
Berlin Thunder players
Cincinnati Bearcats football players
Cincinnati Commandos players
Michigan Wolverines football players
Players of American football from Indianapolis
Tennessee Titans players